Rakhwala is an Indian Bhojpuri action film directed by Aslam Sheikh. It stars Dinesh Lal Yadav and Rinku Ghosh in lead roles along with Avdesh Mishra, Brijesh Tripathi, Santosh Srivastav and Maya Yadav. The film released in Varanasi and Patna, on 1 February 2013 and Mumbai 24 February 2013. It received favorable response from audiences.

Plot
Dharam Singh is the retired army officer. His elder son is a martyr and younger son Satyaprakash has completed his studies, Dharam Singh wishes Satyaprakash to join the army or police force. But Satyaprakash wants to earn and live a simple family life with Shraddha. But his entire life changes after a sudden accident in his life. Satyaprakash's father challenges the strongman Jagdamba Singh who is the ruffian of that place and is supported by politicians, and higher officers, due to which he does all illegal activities like robbery, kidnapping, etc. Once, Dharam Singh was beaten by Jagdamba Singh's mobsters, due to which Satyaprakash is angered and seeks vengeance for his father's mistreatment. He decides to become a police officer and battle corruption. After a few years he becomes an honest police officer. He announces a legal call for all the ruffians like Jabdamba Singh. Police Officer Satyaprakash discovers the evil schemes of the Ministers and higher officers and all the links of terrorists. Before Satyaprakash could catch them red-handed he was injured by them and is hospitalized in I.C.U. Police vow to complete Satyaprakash's incomplete mission. After a few months Satyaprakash's health improves and he resumes his mission. The fact is that Satyaprakash's wife Shraddha and other police officers have replaced one terrorist, Sarfaraj, who is look alike of Satyaprakash. Satyaprakash (Sarfaraj) completes the mission (Rakhwala) and salutes the national flag.

Cast
 Dinesh Lal Yadav as Satyaprakash (Sarfaraj)
 Rinku Ghosh as Shraddha
 Manoj Bhawuk as Satyaprakash's best friend
 Avdesh Mishra as Jagdamba Singh
 Shailesh Pandey as the alcoholic man
 Sambhavna Seth in the item number "Dori Khul Gayeel"
 Maya Yadav in the item number "Devar ho Daba Na Mor Karihaiya"
 Nityanand Shetty as Satyaprakash's father

Soundtrack

References

External links 
 Manoj Bhawuk’s unique journey
 I am not new to this industry: Manoj Bhawuk
 

2013 films
Indian action drama films
Fictional portrayals of the Bihar Police
2010s Bhojpuri-language films
2013 action drama films